Holland Park West is a suburb in the City of Brisbane, Queensland, Australia.

Geography 

Holland Park West is located to the south-east of the Brisbane central business district between the Pacific Motorway and Logan Road.

The South East Busway passes through the suburb which is served by the Holland Park West busway station.

History 
The suburb takes its name from the adjacent suburb of Holland Park, which in turn takes its name from the subdivision of land owned by Julius Holland.

In May 1914, on what is now known as Holland Park West, 62 subdivided allotments of 'Hill Farm Estate' were auctioned by G.T. Bell and Chandler and Russell. A map advertising the auction states the Estate was 12 minutes' walk from the Logan Road tram.

In 1926 the Logan Road tramway was extended to a new terminus at Holland Park. Trams commenced operation on the route on Sunday 1 August 1926.

Holland Park Baptist Church opened on Saturday 15 December 1928 by the President of the Baptist Union, Reverend Alfred George Weller. In 1970 a new church building was constructed on the site, with the former church relocated to the rear of the site. The Grace Bible Church which now occupies the site is not affiliated with the Baptist Union.

Marshall Road State School opened on 25 January 1960.

Holland Park State High School opened on 25 January 1971.

Mount Gravatt West Special School was opened on 28 July 1986. On 1 January 2010, it was renamed Nursery Road State Special School. In 2010, the Xavier Special Education Unit of Whites Hill State College in Camp Hill was transferred to Nursery Road Special School. Originally established in 1970 as the Xavier Special School in Coorparoo, the unit was officially merged into Whites Hill State College in 2002, but was never relocated to the college's site in Camp Hill but remained in Coorparoo until its lease expired in 2009, triggering the move to Mount Gravatt West Special School as being better equipped to accommodate Xavier's conductive education methods for children with multiple impairments. As at 2022, Xavier's conductive education methods continue to be an important program at Nursery Road Special School.

The median age of the Holland Park West population was 35 years of age, 2 years below the Australian median. 73.2% of people living in Holland Park West were born in Australia, compared to the national average of 69.8%; the next most common countries of birth were England 3.1%, New Zealand 3.1%, India 2.1%, China 0.9%, Philippines 0.8%. 81.3% of people spoke only English at home; the next most common languages were 1.6% Greek, 1% Cantonese, 0.8% Punjabi, 0.7% Spanish, 0.5% Italian.

Heritage listings 
There are a number of heritage-listed sites, including:

 Holland Park Hotel (also known as Mountain View Hotel), 935 Logan Road
 Glindemann Farmhouse (also known as Glindemann's Highfield Dairy), 1118 Logan Road
 former Tram Shelter No. 3 (also known as Bus shelter shed), outside 1167 Logan Road
 St Joachim's Catholic Church, 41 Yuletide Street

Education 

Marshall Road State School is a government primary (Prep-6) school for boys and girls at Kurts Street. In 2018, the school had an enrolment of 492 students with 40 teachers (33 full-time equivalent) and 19 non-teaching staff (14 full-time equivalent). It includes a special education program.

Holland Park State High School is a government secondary (7-12) school for boys and girls at Bapaume Road. In 2018, the school had an enrolment of 607 students with 60 teachers (52 full-time equivalent) and 32 non-teaching staff (18 full-time equivalent). It includes a special education program.

Nursery Road State Special School is a special school primary and secondary (Early Childhood-12) school for boys and girls at 49 Nursery Road. In 2018, the school had an enrolment of 150 students with 53 teachers (46 full-time equivalent) and 76 non-teaching staff (47 full-time equivalent). It provides special education including an early childhood development program.

References

External links 

 

Suburbs of the City of Brisbane